Leche (Spanish: "milk") may refer to:

 Leche (surname)
 Leche (Fobia album), 1993
 Leche (Illya Kuryaki and the Valderramas album), 1999
 Leche, a 2010 album by Gregory and the Hawk
 Leche frita, a Spanish sweet

See also
 Laguna de Leche, the largest natural fresh water lake in Cuba
 Lech (disambiguation)